This is a list of transfers involving Premiership teams before or during the 2013-14 season. The Premiership is an English rugby union league.

Bath

Players In
  from  Racing Metro  
  from  US Colomiers
  from  London Irish
  from  London Irish 
  from  London Irish 
  from  London Irish 
  from  Northampton Saints  
  from  Leicester Tigers 
  from  Leicester Tigers 
  from  Munster 
  from  London Welsh 
  from  Bristol Rugby

Players Out
  retired 
  to  Bristol Rugby 
  to  Mitsubishi Sagamihara DynaBoars  
  to  Edinburgh Rugby 
  retired
  released 
  released 
  released 
  to  Bristol Rugby
  to  Toulon

Exeter Chiefs

Players In
 Ceri Sweeney from  Cardiff Blues
 Dave Lewis from  Gloucester Rugby 
 Tom James from  Cardiff Blues 
 Greg Bateman from  London Welsh 
 Fetu'u Vainikolo from  Connacht 
 Don Armand from  Stormers 
 Romana Graham from  Chiefs

Players Out
 Chris Budgen retired 
 Simon Alcott retired 
 Neil Clark to  Oyonnax  
 Aly Muldowney to  Connacht
 Richard Baxter retired 
 Kevin Barrett retired 
 Junior Poluleuligaga to  Auckland 
 Myles Dorrian to  London Irish 
 Ignacio Mieres to  Worcester Warriors 
 Josh Tatupu to  US Carcassonne  
 Gonzalo Camacho to  Leicester Tigers
 Mark Foster to  Jersey 
 Nic Sestaret released 
 Watisoni Votu to  USA Perpignan

Gloucester

Players In
 Matt Kvesic from  Worcester Warriors 
 James Hudson from  Newcastle Falcons 
 Tavis Knoyle from  Scarlets 
 Jonny Bentley from  Cornish Pirates 
 Dan George from  London Welsh

Players Out
 Jim Hamilton to  Montpellier 
 Alex Brown retired 
 Peter Buxton retired 
 Will Graulich to  Cornish Pirates 
 Dave Lewis to  Exeter Chiefs  
 Dario Chistolini to  Zebre 
 Drew Locke to  Jersey
 Tommaso D'Apice to  Zebre

Harlequins

Players In
 Paul Doran-Jones from  Northampton Saints 
 Nick Kennedy from  Toulon 
 Paul Sackey from  Stade Francais

Players Out
 James Johnston to  Saracens 
 Tim Fairbrother retired 
 Chris Brooker to  Worcester Warriors 
 Peter Browne to  London Welsh 
 Olly Kohn retired 
 Will Skinner retired 
 Rory Clegg to  Newcastle Falcons 
 Miles Mantella to  London Scottish 
 Seb Stegmann to  London Welsh

Leicester Tigers

Players In
 Owen Williams from  Scarlets 
 Ryan Lamb from  Northampton Saints 
 Gonzalo Camacho from  Exeter Chiefs 
 Neil Briggs from  London Welsh 
 Jamie Gibson from  London Irish 
 Jérôme Schuster from  USA Perpignan 
 David Mélé from  USA Perpignan 
 Sebastian de Chaves from  Stade Montois 
 Tom Bristow from  London Welsh

Players Out
 Kieran Brookes to  Newcastle Falcons 
 Jonny Harris to  London Irish 
 Jimmy Stevens to  London Irish
 Alex Lewington to  London Irish 
 Camilo Parilli-Ocampo to  Ealing Trailfinders
 Charlie Clare to  Bedford Blues 
 Rob Andrew to  London Welsh 
 Brett Deacon retired 
 Richard Thorpe to  London Welsh 
 Ben Woods retired 
 Patrick Phibbs to  London Irish 
 George Ford to  Bath Rugby 
 Micky Young to  Bath Rugby 
 Matt Cornwell to  Mogliano 
 Andy Forsyth to  Sale Sharks 
 Andy Symons to  Tasman Makos 
 Martin Castrogiovanni to  Toulon 
 Geordan Murphy retired

London Irish

Players In
 Andy Fenby from  Scarlets 
 Jamie Hagan from  Leinster 
 Jonny Harris from  Leicester Tigers 
 Jimmy Stevens from  Leicester Tigers 
 Alex Lewington from  Leicester Tigers 
 Matt Parr from  Nottingham 
 Nic Rouse from  Nottingham 
 Michael Mayhew from  Newcastle Falcons 
 Eamonn Sheridan from  Rotherham Titans 
 Fergus Mulchrone from  Rotherham Titans 
 Blair Cowan from  Worcester Warriors 
 Patrick Phibbs from  Leicester Tigers 
 Myles Dorrian from  Exeter Chiefs 
 Guy Armitage from  Toulon 
 John Yapp from  Edinburgh Rugby (season-Loan) 
 James O'Connor from  Melbourne Rebels

Players Out
 Alex Corbisiero to  Northampton Saints 
 Max Lahiff to  Melbourne Rebels 
 Jerry Yanuyanutawa to  Glasgow Warriors
 Brian Blaney released 
 James Buckland to  London Scottish 
 Scott Lawson to  Newcastle Falcons 
 Shaun Malton to  Nottingham 
 James Sandford to  Cornish Pirates 
 Jamie Gibson to  Leicester Tigers 
 Matt Garvey to  Bath Rugby 
 Alex Gray to  England Sevens 
 Anthony Watson to  Bath Rugby 
 David Sisi to  Bath Rugby 
 Jonathan Joseph to  Bath Rugby 
 Jack Moates to  London Wasps 
 Steven Shingler to  Scarlets 
 Joe Ansbro retired 
 Conor Gaston to  Aurillac

London Wasps

Players In
 Matt Mullan from  Worcester Warriors 
 Neil Cochrane from  Bedford Blues
 Jake Cooper-Woolley from  Cardiff Blues 
 Joe Carlisle from  Worcester Warriors 
 Andy Goode from  Worcester Warriors 
 Ricky Reeves from  Bedford Blues 
 Kearnan Myall from  Sale Sharks 
 Ed Jackson from  London Welsh 
 Guy Thompson from  Jersey 
 Nathan Hughes from  North Harbour 
 Rory Pitman from  Rotherham Titans 
 Jack Moates from  London Irish
 Josh Bassett from  Bedford Blues 
 Ben Jacobs from  Western Force 
 William Helu from  Manly 
 Taione Vea from  North Harbour 
 Esteban Lozada from  Agen  
 Carlo Festuccia from  Zebre

Players Out
 Tim Payne retired 
 Zak Taulafo to  Stade Francais 
 Fabio Staibano released 
 Lewis Thiede to  London Scottish 
 Rhys Thomas to  Newport Gwent Dragons 
 Marco Wentzel released 
 Billy Vunipola to  Saracens 
 Nic Berry retired 
 Stephen Jones retired 
 Nicky Robinson to  Bristol Rugby 
 Will Robinson to  London Welsh 
 Lee Thomas retired 
 Jack Wallace to  Bristol Rugby

Newcastle Falcons

Players In 
 Kieran Brookes from  Leicester Tigers 
 Scott Lawson from  London Irish 
 Dominic Barrow from  Leeds Carnegie 
 Fraser McKenzie from  Sale Sharks 
 Andy Saull from  Saracens 
 Mike Blair from  CA Brive 
 Rory Clegg from  Harlequins 
 Phil Godman from  London Scottish 
 Danny Barnes from  Munster 
 Noah Cato from  Northampton Saints 
 Franck Montanella from  London Welsh

Players Out
 Jon Golding retired 
 James Hall to  Bristol Rugby  
 Michael Mayhew to  London Irish 
 James Hudson to  Gloucester Rugby  
 Ollie Stedman to  London Welsh 
 Taiasina Tui'fua to Union Bordeaux-Bègles  
 Rory Lawson retired 
 Jordi Pasqualin to  London Scottish 
 Jimmy Gopperth to  Leinster 
 Luke Fielden to  England Sevens

Northampton Saints

Players In
 Alex Corbisiero from  London Irish 
 Gareth Denman from  Rotherham Titans 
 Salesi Ma'afu from  Western Force 
 Kahn Fotuali'i from  Ospreys 
 George North from  Scarlets
 Rob Verbakel from  Otago 
 Glenn Dickson from  Otago

Players Out
 Paul Doran-Jones to  Harlequins 
 Brian Mujati to  Racing Metro 
 Soane Tonga'uiha to  Racing Metro 
 Mark Sorenson to  Bristol Rugby 
 Rhys Oakley to  Plymouth Albion 
 Martin Roberts to  Bath Rugby 
 Ryan Lamb to  Leicester Tigers 
 Tom May to  London Welsh
 Scott Armstrong to  Moseley
 Noah Cato to  Newcastle Falcons

Sale Sharks

Players In
 Tom Arscott from  London Welsh 
 Andy Forsyth from  Leicester Tigers 
 Phil Mackenzie from  London Welsh 
 Daniel Baines from  Rotherham Titans 
 Michael Paterson from  Cardiff Blues 
 Kirill Kulemin from  London Welsh 
 Charlie Walker-Blair from  Jersey 
 Jonathan Mills from  London Welsh 
 Joe Ford from  Leeds Carnegie

Players Out
 Alasdair Dickinson to  Edinburgh Rugby
 Tom Cruse to  Rotherham Titans 
 Richie Gray to  Castres Olympique 
 Richie Vernon to  Glasgow Warriors
 Andy Powell to  Wigan Warriors 
 Jordan Davies to  Salford City Reds 
 Corne Uys to  Aix-en-Provence
 Charlie Amesbury to  Bristol Rugby

Saracens

Players In
 James Johnston from  Harlequins 
 Richard Barrington from  Jersey 
 Billy Vunipola from  London Wasps 
 Tim Streather from  Nottingham 
 Michael Tagicakibau from  Bristol Rugby

Players Out
 Carlos Nieto retired 
 John Smit retired
 Andy Saull to  Newcastle Falcons 
 Kameli Ratuvou to  Zebre 
 Joe Maddock retired

Worcester Warriors

Players In
 Paul Andrew from  Cornish Pirates 
 Jérémy Bécasseau from  Stade Francais (season-loan) 
 Ofa Fainga'anuku from  Glasgow Warriors 
 Chris Brooker from  Harlequins 
 Agustin Creevy from  Montpellier 
 Mike Williams from  Blue Bulls 
 Jonathan Thomas from  Ospreys 
 Cameron Goodhue from  Blues 
 Leonardo Senatore from  Pampas XV 
 Jeremy Su'a from  Crusaders 
 Ignacio Mieres from  Exeter Chiefs 
 Paul Warwick from  Stade Francais 
 James Stephenson from  Bedford Blues 
 Mariano Galarza from  Pampas XV

Players Out
 Jamie Currie to  Leeds Carnegie
 Matt Mullan to  London Wasps 
 Tevita Taumoepeau retired 
 Ollie Hayes to  Bristol Rugby 
 Aleki Lutui to  Edinburgh Rugby 
 Craig Gillies retired 
 Neil Best to  London Scottish 
 Matt Kvesic to  Gloucester Rugby 
 Blair Cowan to  London Irish 
 Ollie Frost to  London Welsh 
 Shaun Perry retired
 Joe Carlisle to  London Wasps 
 Andy Goode to  London Wasps 
 Andy Short to  Bristol Rugby 
 Nikki Walker to  Edinburgh Rugby 
 Errie Claassens to  Bristol Rugby

See also 

 2013–14 Premiership

References 

2013-14
2013–14 English Premiership (rugby union)